is a 2018 Kenyan drama film directed by Wanuri Kahiu. Rafiki is the story of romance that grows between two young women, Kena and Ziki, amidst family and political pressures around LGBT rights in Kenya. The film had its international premiere in the Un Certain Regard section at the 2018 Cannes Film Festival; it was the first Kenyan film to be screened at the festival.

Plot
Kena helps her father John Mwaura run a small convenience store in Nairobi as he campaigns for a local election. Kena lives with her mother, who isn't really on speaking terms with John. Kena starts flirting with Ziki, a neighbourhood girl with colourful hair, who also happens to be the daughter of Peter Okemi, John's political rival.
Kena and Ziki have a number of romantic dates, and quickly become very close, but there are tensions about displaying their affection in public because homosexuality is illegal in Kenya.

Ziki's friends get jealous that she is spending so much time with Kena, and when they attack Kena, Ziki defends her. Ziki takes Kena home to dress her wounds, but Ziki's mom catches them kissing. They run away together to hide, but are found by the town gossip, who brings an angry mob to attack the two girls. They are both arrested, and have to be picked up by their fathers. Ziki can no longer bear to see Kena, and her parents send her to live in London. John refuses to let Kena take the blame for what happened, even though it means forfeiting his chance at winning the election.

A few years later, Kena has fulfilled her dream to become a doctor, and gets word that Ziki has returned to town. The film ends just as they are reunited: after all these years their love has not died.

Cast

Production 
The film is inspired by Ugandan Monica Arac de Nyeko's 2007 Caine Prize-winning short story "Jambula Tree". The film's title "Rafiki" (meaning "friend" in Swahili) was chosen, because due to homophobia in society, partners in a same-sex relationship often need to introduce their partner as a "friend", even if they are more than a friend.

It took several years to find funding to produce the film. The filmmakers initially tried to get funding in Kenya, but that was not possible, so they found co-production partners in Europe as well as financing from Lebanon and the United States.

Colours played an important role in the cinematography and art direction of the film. The filmmakers wanted to show that Nairobi is a very colourful city, which is why there is a lot of colour in the film. Scenes of intimacy between Kena and Ziki are shown in more tender pastel colours rather than the strong colour contrasts of the other scenes.

It was Samantha Mugatsia's first film as an actress. Kahiu discovered her at a friend's party and asked her to audition for the role, as she had some of the characteristics of the character Kena. Sheila Munyiva had acted in films before.

Reception
On Metacritic the film has a score of 68 out of 100 based on reviews from 17 critics, indicating "generally favorable reviews".

Ban in Kenya
Rafiki was banned by the Kenya Film Classification Board (KFCB) "due to its homosexual theme and clear intent to promote lesbianism in Kenya contrary to the law". The Board asked the film director to change the ending, as it was too hopeful and positive. Kahiu refused, which led to the ban of the film. The KFCB warned that anyone found in possession of the film would be in breach of the law in Kenya, where gay sex is punishable by 14 years in jail. The ban raised international outrage by the supporters of LGBT rights.

The film's director, Wanuri Kahiu, sued Kenya's government, to allow the film to be screened and become eligible to be submitted as Kenya's entry for the Academy Award for Best Foreign Language Film at the 91st Academy Awards. On 21 September 2018, the Kenyan High Court temporarily lifted the ban on the film, allowing it to be screened in the country for seven days and meeting the minimum eligibility requirement. Once the ban was lifted, the film played to sold-out crowds at a cinema in Nairobi. Despite the concession, it was not selected as Kenya's submission in the Foreign Language Film category, with Supa Modo being sent instead.

Awards
Mugatsia won the Best Actress award at the 2019 FESPACO in Ouagadougou, Burkina Faso for her portrayal of Kena.

References

External links
 

2018 films
2018 drama films
2018 LGBT-related films
English-language Kenyan films
Kenyan LGBT-related films
LGBT-related drama films
Lesbian-related films
Swahili-language films
Kenyan drama films
Censored films
2010s English-language films